Simon Nielsen may refer to:
 Simon Nielsen (ice hockey) (born 1986), Danish ice hockey goaltender
 Simon Nielsen (speedway rider) (born 1990), Danish motorcycle speedway rider